Tip Top is a slang phrase which means of the highest order or excellent. Tip Top, Tip-Top or TipTop may refer to:

Places
 Tip Top, Arizona, a ghost town in Arizona
 Tiptop, Kentucky
 Tip-Top House, on Mount Washington in New Hampshire
 Tip Top (Clarksville, Tennessee), listed on the National Register of Historic Places (NRHP)
 Tip Top Building in White River Junction, Vermont
 Tiptop, Virginia

Businesses
 Tip Top Bakeries, an Australian bread manufacturer
 Ward Baking Company, makers of Tip-Top Bread
 Tip-Top Restaurant, franchise in Nicaragua
 Tip Top Tailors, a Canadian menswear company
 Tip Top Tailors Building, their former headquarters and a heritage industrial building in Toronto, Canada
 Tip-Top, a British discount pharmacy chain taken over by Superdrug in 1987
 TipTop Technologies, search engine
 Le Tip Top, a bar and restaurant in Monte Carlo
 Tip Top (ice cream), an ice cream brand in New Zealand
 Tip-Top Products, manufacturer of hair care products

Entertainment
 Brooklyn Tip-Tops, American baseball team
 Radio Tip Top, a BBC Radio One comedy show from the mid-1990s
 TipTop (band), a German synthpop band from Bavaria
 TipTop (video game), a puzzle game created by ASAP Games and published by PopCap Games
 Congo Bongo, a 1983 Sega arcade game also called Tip Top
 Tip Top (film), a 2013 French film
 Tip-Top, a fictional singer portrayed by Jarvis Cocker in The French Dispatch, artist of Chansons d'Ennui Tip-Top

Other
 Tip Top, an amusement/carnival attraction manufactured by Frank Hrubetz & Company
 TIPTOP website, The Internet Pilot to Physics
 Tippe top, a toy top